The Federal Correctional Institution, Oxford (FCI Oxford) is a medium-security United States federal prison for male inmates in Wisconsin. It is operated by the Federal Bureau of Prisons, a division of the United States Department of Justice. The facility also has an adjacent satellite prison camp that houses minimum-security male offenders.

FCI Oxford is located in Adams County, in central Wisconsin, 60 miles north of Madison, the state capital.

Notable incidents
On June 21, 2011, Timothy Washington (15022-047), a 48-year-old inmate serving a sentence for drug trafficking, stabbed another inmate with a homemade prison weapon known as a shank. The victim suffered 16 stab wounds, but survived the assault. Washington pleaded guilty to assault with a dangerous weapon in February 2012 and was sentenced to an additional 33 months in prison. He was transferred to USP Terre Haute and is scheduled for release in 2021.

Notable inmates (current and former)

See also
List of U.S. federal prisons
Federal Bureau of Prisons
Incarceration in the United States

References 

Oxford
Buildings and structures in Adams County, Wisconsin
Prisons in Wisconsin